Ignacio Urrutia Manzano (July 1, 1879 – February 8, 1951) was a Chilean politician. He served twice as President of the Senate of Chile and minister.

He was born in Concepción, the son of Luis Urrutia Rozas and of Aurora Manzano Benavente. He completed his studies in his native city, and then attended the Naval Academy, where he became a naval officer. As such, he was sent to supervise the construction of several ships that were being built at the Armstrong shipyards in Newcastle upon Tyne. He eventually returned to Chile on board the recently completed "Esmeralda". He retired from the navy in 1906 while at the same time renouncing his pension. He married Luzmila de la Sotta Benavente and together they had seven children.

He started his political career as mayor of the city of Parral. He joined the Liberal Party and was elected a deputy for "Loncomilla, Linares and Parral" (1926–1930) and was reelected for the same constituency (1930–1934). President Juan Esteban Montero appointed him Minister of War and Navy, position he held between April 8 and June 4, 1932. His political career was put on hold by the collapse of the second administration of President Montero and the dissolution of the National Congress by a Government Junta; due to the advent of the Socialist Republic of Chile.

He was elected a Senator for "Talca and Maule" (1933–1941) and President of the Senate on May 31, 1933. He was reelected as president of the Senate in 1935. He died in Parral on February 8, 1951 at the age of 71.

1879 births
1951 deaths
People from Concepción, Chile
Chilean people of Basque descent
Liberal Party (Chile, 1849) politicians
United Liberal Party (Chile) politicians
Deputies of the XXXV Legislative Period of the National Congress of Chile
Deputies of the XXXVI Legislative Period of the National Congress of Chile
Presidents of the Senate of Chile
Members of the Senate of Chile